The 1951 Paris Grand Prix was a Non-Championship Formula One motor race held on 20 May 1951 at the Bois de Boulogne, in Paris, France. It was the last motor race to take place at the circuit, due to concerns over driver and spectator safety.

The 125-lap race was won by Maserati driver Giuseppe Farina, with José Froilán González and Louis Rosier second and third in Talbot-Lagos. Emmanuel de Graffenried started from pole in a Maserati and Juan Manuel Fangio set fastest lap in a Simca-Gordini.

Results

References

Paris